The Night of the Devils is a 1972 film directed by Giorgio Ferroni. It is loosely based on the Aleksey Konstantinovich Tolstoy's novel The Family of the Vourdalak.

Plot
The patriarch of a wealthy family fears that he will show up one day in vampire form. Should this happen, he warns his family not to let him back in his house, no matter how much he begs them.

Cast

Production
The Night of the Devils was an Italian and Spanish co-production financed by Eduardo Manzanos Brochero's Copercines and two Italian companies: Filmes and Due Emme. The latter company was founded in 1971 by Roberto Maldera who also had a main role in the film, and Luigi Mariani. The Night of the Devils was shot in five weeks starting in late 1971 to early 1972 near Bracciano Lake. Director Ferroni was 63 when directing the film and nearly deaf and had to shoot the film with the assistance of a hearing aid.

Release
The Night of the Devils was distributed theatrically in Italy on 29 April 1972 where it was distributed by P.A.C. It grossed a total of 156,686,000 Italian lire in Italy. It was released in Spain on 25 June 1973.

Reception
In a contemporary review, Nigel Andrews reviewed a dubbed 88 minute version. Andrews stated that despite "the brief surrealist promise of the opening scenes-a close-up of a face crawling with larvae cutting ingeniously to Niccola's head enveloped in the serpentine wires of an encephalograph", Night of the Devils had "all the usual defects of a low-budget horror quickie-careless direction, mechanical performances, some obtrusively unconvincing day-for-night sequences" find that the film "provides little in the way of style to compensate for a story which staggers dully from one bloodthirsty set-piece to another."

References

Footnotes

Sources

External links

1972 films
Spanish vampire films
Films directed by Giorgio Ferroni
1972 horror films
Films based on Russian novels
Italian vampire films
Gothic horror films
Films about witchcraft
Films shot in Italy
1970s Italian films